Petty Officer Dylan "Dutchy" Mulholland, MG is a fictional character in the Australia TV drama Sea Patrol. His character is a replacement for the character Pete "Buffer" Tomaszewski, whose last appearance was in the final episode of season three. Dutchy is portrayed by Conrad Coleby.

"Dutchy", as he is known as by the crew, is a veteran of the Gulf War and was awarded the Medal for Gallantry (MG) after a boarding party incident, which ended with his Boarding Officer killed, which explains his protective behavior towards Lieutenant Kate McGregor, HMAS Hammersley's XO and Dutchy's new boarding officer.

At the end of the series, it is revealed that he will serve in Afghanistan.

Sea Patrol characters
Television characters introduced in 2010
Fictional Royal Australian Navy personnel
Fictional Gulf War veterans
Fictional War in Afghanistan (2001–2021) veterans